Ecuador and its two OTI member stations, Teleamazonas and Ecuavisa debuted in the OTI Festival in 1974 in the third edition of the festival, which was held in the coastal city of Acapulco, with the singer Hilda Murillo with her song "Las mariposas" (The butterflies). Since then, the Andean country took part in the contest util the last edition in 2000 which was held again in Acapulco.

History 
Ecuador's history in the Latin American song contest did not yield any victories. Teleamazonas and Ecuavisa, however, achieved a number of top 5 finishes.

The Ecuatorian debut in the OTI Festival was successful because of Hilda Murillo's fifth place. After that, the country didn't repeat that success, and in the following two years, the delegation ended in the bottom five of the scoreboard. However, in 1977 the female singer Marielisa with her song "Sonreir cuando quiero llorar" (To smile when I want to cry) took the Ecuadorian broadcasters back to fifth place. In contrast, in 1978, 1979 and 1980, Ecuador registered its worst placings ever with two last places with zero points.

After some unsuccessful participations, in 1985 in Seville, the indigenous Quechua singer Jesús Fichamba recorded a second-place finish for Ecuador for the first time with his song "La pinta, la niña y la Santa María" in a reference to the three boats led by Christopher Columbus, who discovered America. The performer, who appeared on stage with the traditional Quechua suit, was acclaimed.

Two years later in Lisbon, the Andean country repeated the success with another indigenous singer, Gustavo Velázquez, and his ethnic pop song "Mi amigo el condor" (My friend the Condor).

National Final 
Ecuavisa and Teleamazonas also organised an annual national contest in order to select the Ecuatorian participant in the OTI Festival. As in the other participating countries who opted for this way of selecting their entrants, the winner was selected by a professional jury.

Contestants

References 

OTI Festival
Ecuadorian music